The Nebraska Kansas Colorado Railway , formerly the Nebraska, Kansas and Colorado RailNet, is based in Grant, NE and operates about  of track in Southwestern Nebraska, Northern Kansas and Northeastern Colorado.  It carries mainly agricultural related products, especially grains, as well as coal to the Nebraska Public Power District's Gerald Gentleman Station which is Nebraska's largest coal-fired power plant. It is owned by OmniTRAX.

External links
 
Nebraska Kansas Colorado Railway Inc.

Nebraska railroads
Colorado railroads
Kansas railroads
Regional railroads in the United States
OmniTRAX